Serious Sam 2 is a first-person shooter video game released for Microsoft Windows and Xbox and the sequel to the 2001 video game Serious Sam. It was developed by Croteam and was released on 11 October 2005. The game was initially published by 2K Games, a Take-Two Interactive subsidiary. The game was later made available on Steam on 31 January 2012. While the game was originally released only for Microsoft Windows and Xbox, an unofficial Linux version of the game was created and is being handled by Linux Installers for Linux Gamers.

In the single-player campaign, the player assumes the role of hero Sam "Serious" Stone in his adventures against the forces of the extraterrestrial overlord, "Mental", who seeks to destroy humanity. Taking place after the events of Serious Sam: The Second Encounter, Sam travels through various worlds collecting parts of a medallion in an effort to defeat Mental. He is guided by the Sirian Great Council and receives sporadic aid from the natives of the worlds he visits. The multiplayer mode includes online co-op and deathmatch, the latter having been introduced in a patch.

Croteam simultaneously developed Serious Engine 2, the successor to their previous game engine, Serious Engine, for use in the game, and the engine is capable of many features of other advanced game engines of the time including high dynamic range rendering and light bloom. The engine supports integration with both Xfire and GameSpy Arcade for multiplayer match finding. Serious Sam 2 is the only game to use the proprietary engine, though the Serious Engine 2 is available for licensing.

Gameplay 

Serious Sam 2'''s gameplay consists almost entirely of the player attempting to defeat dozens of enemies at a time, and thus is relatively simple. The game's story establishes the reasons and methods for how the player travels from chapter to chapter. This is a significant change from the previous games in the series in which the story existed merely to transport the player from place to place in order to kill as many enemies as possible in the process, with the plot consisting merely of messages that the player could disregard without consequence. Serious Sam 2 features the story more prominently, but still maintains the focus on killing as many enemies as possible. The story is developed through the use of cut scenes, which are interspersed throughout the game, especially at the beginning and end of each Planet.

The player begins with a certain number of lives that represent the number of times the player is allowed to lose all of his health (and then re-spawn immediately from the player's last saved checkpoint). More complicated gameplay mechanics that are often found in other games (such as jumping puzzles) are rare, and when encountered they are fairly simple, usually requiring the player to locate keys/objects in order to unlock doors or advance to the next level. Player-controlled vehicles (such as hover bikes and saucers) were introduced to the series in Serious Sam 2. Vehicles feature turrets such as rocket launchers, machine guns, and laser turrets.

The simplistic gameplay of Serious Sam 2 is similar to that of previous games in the series, but Serious Sam 2's lives system is a radical departure from the original games in the series (which would allow you to resume from checkpoints or saved games an infinite number of times). Although Serious Sam for Xbox was the first game in the series to feature a "lives system", Serious Sam 2 was the first PC game in the series to implement this system.Game Manual for Serious Sam (Xbox)

Blood and gore effects have been improved relative to the previous games, and all enemies other than bosses can be gibbed. Living foes can disintegrate into blood and bloody bits, undead entities, excluding Kleer Skeletons, can be reduced to decaying bits and slime, while magical creatures' destruction is marked with sparkle effects and purple gases. Power-ups are scattered throughout the game and can be obtained by destroying certain objects. The player is able to pick up certain objects and manipulate them in a manner similar to the effects of the Gravity Gun from Half-Life 2, though without the necessity of an external device.

While the game features various enemies seen in first person shooters, such as soldiers with chainguns, blasters and rocket launchers, there are also many other oddball enemies, like witches, clockwork toy rhinos, zombie stockbrokers with shotguns and suicidal exploding clowns. Different chapters feature native "chapter specific" enemies; for example the Kleer World features Flying Kleers and the Oriental setting of Chi Fang features Martial Arts Zombies. The players will also meet non-player characters (NPCs) throughout the game. There are five different groups of NPCs in the game: The Sirians, the Simbas, Zixies, Chi Che, and Elvians, each native to their respective planet. The different groups of NPCs help the player throughout the different settings of the game, with each group of NPC corresponding to a different setting in the game.

 Multiplayer 
A prominent feature in the previous Serious Sam games was cooperative gameplay, in which multiple players could play the single-player campaign together. Serious Sam 2 focused on this game mode even more than its predecessors, as it was the only multiplayer mode to be included when the game was released, although deathmatch was later added in a patch. The PC version allows up to sixteen people to play together, while the Xbox version allows four players, either via Xbox systemlink or Xbox Live. Unlike the previous games, Serious Sam 2 support split-screen gameplay on the PC but does not support on Xbox.

 Weapons 
Weapons in Serious Sam 2 were largely remodeled versions of the weapons found in the previous games in the Serious Sam series. Most of the weapons from the previous games returned, such as the rocket launcher, grenade launcher, 12-gauge double-barrel sawed-off shotgun and a sniper rifle. The minigun, a staple of the series, also makes a return, and is a weapon of particular significance as it was featured prominently on the cover of the box for many of the previous Serious Sam games. The Serious Bomb also made a return, maintaining its status as the most powerful weapon in the game by being able to eliminate every enemy on the screen. The Serious Bomb is described as a "miniature big bang" and as "Instant Death With a Smile," and the player is only able to carry a maximum of three due to their size. Protecting the player from the immense power of the Serious Bomb is a "Life-Preserving-Quantum-Field(TM)."Serious Sam 2 introduced new weapons to the series, including "Clawdovic Cacadoos Vulgaris," (the name is pronounced in Croatian as Klodovik, which is a reference to a parrot Klodovik in the comic series Alan Ford ) a parrot clutching a bomb in its talons that can fly to an enemy to eliminate it, and throwable hand grenades. In addition to dual revolvers, the game also includes an additional sidearm of a brand-new design. The "Hydro-Plasmatic Handgun" can fire small units of energy at a "decent rate of fire," and it can also be fired in a mode that allows the projectile to direct itself towards an enemy. Also introduced to the game are twin automatic Uzis replacing the tommygun from the earlier games of the series.

 Plot 

The game's story picks up shortly after the end of Serious Sam: The Second Encounter, with the hero of the series, Sam "Serious" Stone, continuing his goal to defeat his nemesis, Mental. The game begins with Serious Sam being summoned before the Sirian Great Council, where the Council provides him with guidance on how to accomplish his goal to defeat Mental. The Council reveals to Sam that he must collect all five pieces of an ancient Sirian medallion, each held by various races on five different planets, and states that once Sam has the entire medallion, Mental will be vulnerable. All the planets (except Kleer) are populated by friendly, bobble-headed humanoids, but the problem is that all the planets are under Mental's control. The Council then instructs Sam to visit all five planets in order to recreate the medallion, only then will Sam become "The One". Confused at the moment and with nothing better to do, Sam accepts the mission. With the medallion finally complete, Sam is now ready to begin the final assault against the greatest enemy of humanity... Mental, who is located on Sirius, once the planet of the great Sirians that visited Earth many times, now the domain of Mental himself. But in order to gain access to Sirius, Sam is asked to storm Kronor, a moon orbiting Sirius that has a massive cannon which could be used to remove Sirius' protection shield, which was a last line of defense for the Sirians against Mental. And so, Sam's mission continues. In the endgame, Sam enters Mental Institution after disabling it and into Mental's throne room. Sam finally encounters Mental in person while the lights are off. Mental tries to reveal to Sam that he is his father, but Sam interrupts by shooting him, thus silencing Mental forever. After that, the Sirian Great Council, even the inhabitants from the planets, celebrate their long-awaited victory against Mental. When the lights come back on however, it is revealed that Mental wasn't there at all and it was instead just a speaker attached to Mental's throne, implying that he actually tricked Sam in order to escape in his starship into deep space (in the Xbox version, the game doesn't show this scene). The credits roll after that, where a dialog of three unknown people is played discussing how this ending might just be another one of Croteam's bad jokes and how big Mental's boss fight could be.

After the credits, a silent-motion scene shows Sam returning to the Sirian Great Council with the medallion in hand. As they take the medallion however, Sam soon discovers that the Council had cardboard boxes full of those medallions. Sam then becomes enraged and chases the Council around their room.

 Development 

Development of Serious Sam 2 began in mid-2003 with the decision to create the game on a new engine. Croteam planned to release the game in the second quarter of 2004, but this was later pushed to the second half of 2004 and finally to fall 2005. For a period of time, Croteam posted weekly updates, but these became bi-monthly, then monthly, and then stopped completely after August 2004, as Gathering of Developers shut down and folded into 2K Games, Croteam's publisher, wanted to handle the release of information from that point forward. In April 2005, the game was officially announced by 2K Games, at which point the release date was set as Fall 2005.

Shortly following the game's official announcement, Serious Sam 2 was featured as the cover story for the June 2005 issue of Computer Games Magazine, and was later showcased at E3 in May 2005. Shown at the E3 Expo was the official trailer for the game, and an early build of the game was playable on the show floor. A result of the E3 presentation was a 30-minute video preview of the game featuring gameplay footage while a question and answer session took place between fansite Seriously! owner and director Jason Rodzik and Fernando Melo, the game's producer. In the time following the game's official announcement, 2K Games released a steady trickle of screenshots showcasing the vibrant colors and wide-open spaces that characterized the previous games and helping to build up hype as the game neared release. A demo of the PC version was released on 21 September 2005, and a second demo was released on 17 October 2005.

On 11 October 2005, Serious Sam 2 was released for PC and Xbox, and a patch for the game was released the day before, bringing it up to version 2.064b. Croteam stated that a substantial list of features were cut due to time constraints.

Serious Engine 2, the game engine for Serious Sam 2 was developed alongside the development of the game itself, and was a brand new revision of Croteam's prior Serious Engine that was used for their previous games, such as Serious Sam: The First Encounter. The more advanced features of the engine include detailed refraction effects, high-resolution textures, high-dynamic range lighting, and light bloom effects.

 Release patches 

On 16 December 2005, two months after the game's release, Croteam released a patch to bring the game up to version 2.066. The most significant change to the game with the patch was the addition of a dedicated server for the game, although the patch included various bug fixes. On 6 March 2006, Croteam released their second patch, adding deathmatch support to the game. The most recent patch for the game was version 2.070 which was released on 24 April 2006. The patch fixed minor bugs and included Serious Editor 2, the content editor for Serious Engine 2, the game engine used in Serious Sam 2.

 Level editor

Croteam developed their own level editor, Serious Editor 2, and used it for the development of Serious Sam 2. The editor has significantly more features than the original Serious Editor that was used for the previous Serious Sam games. Serious Editor 2 allows geometry to be imported and exported to and from third-party 3D programs, such as 3D Studio Max, via an intermediate file format, thus allowing for plugins to be easily created for any 3D modeling program. Two methods of creating particle systems exist in the editor, and they can be created either as procedural particle systems or emitter systems. The editor also features its own interpreted language, similar to C++, which allows for relatively simple mod programming, and a script editor and debugger, enabling the level designer to control gameplay events more directly.

In addition to the standard level editor, there is also a mechanism editor for physics and collision setup, an animation editor for modifying camera paths and animation of objects, a skeleton editor for configuring the skeletal structures of characters, a destruction editor, mesh editor, model editor, and font editor.

One of the most significant and more distinctive features of Serious Editor 2's level editor is that it allows for real-time editing. The level design process for most games often requires the level to be modified in the editor, compiled, saved, and then loaded separately in the game where it can be tested. However, Serious Editor 2 allows for levels to be played and tested within the editor without requiring compilation. While playing the level within the editor, the level designer can directly switch to editing mode, make the desired modifications, and then continue playing, greatly simplifying the final stages of level editing.

 Reception 

Unlike its predecessors, Serious Sam: The First Encounter and Serious Sam: The Second Encounter, the first of which was awarded GameSpot PC Game of the Year in 2001, Serious Sam 2 received less praising reviews. The game's average review is a 75% according to GameRankings. Its highest mark by mainstream media was a 4.5/5.0 from Computer Gaming World, though most reviews were in the 70% or 80% range. Other notable reviews include GamePro rating it 4/5 and GameSpy giving it a 3.5/5 (Good). IGN awarded Serious Sam 2 an 8.2/10, summing up the sentiments of many of other publications' reviews:

One of the main criticisms of the game was that it was a lot less "serious" and a lot more "cartoony" than The First Encounter and The Second Encounter. An over-emphasis on reflective surfaces and oddly out of place pixel shading were perceived as being more about showing off the capabilities of the engine than about defining the atmosphere of the game. Lighter colors and a more upbeat soundtrack made the game feel less grounded in reality, contrary to the realistic Egyptian tombs and Mayan pyramids of the earlier games, and players complained that while the weapons of the previous games seemed to be massive and powerful, those in Serious Sam 2'' were less so.

References

External links 
 

2005 video games
2K games
Devolver Digital games
First-person shooters
Indie video games
Multiplayer and single-player video games
Serious Sam
Video game sequels
Video games developed in Croatia
Video games set on fictional planets
Windows games
Xbox games